|}

The Kempton Mares' Hurdle, run under the sponsored title of the Racing TV Mares' Hurdle, is a Listed National Hunt hurdle race in Great Britain which is open to mares aged four years or older. It is run at Kempton over a distance of about 3 miles and 110 yards (4,929 metres), and during its running there are twelve hurdles to be jumped. The race is scheduled to take place each year in November.

First run in 2007, the Kempton Mares' Hurdle was won by Refinement who was trained by Jonjo O'Neill and ridden by AP McCoy. The race, originally called Friends of Nigel Clark Mares' Only Hurdle, was set up in memory of the course's steward Nigel Clark. Since 2008 the race has had a number of sponsors including Starlight Children's Foundation, Ladbrokes and Coolmore Stud until 2012 when OLBG.com became the race sponsors and the race became known as the OLBG Mares' Hurdle. Racing TV have sponsored the race since 2019.

The Kempton Mares' Hurdle was the second race of the OLBG Mares' Road to Cheltenham, a series set up to help improve the quality of mares in National Hunt Racing.

Records
Most successful horse:
 no horse has won this race more than once

Leading jockey (2 wins):
 Barry Geraghty - Carole's Legacy (2010), Whoops A Daisy (2011)
 Leighton Aspell - Surtee Du Berlais (2016), Papagana (2019)

Leading trainer (2 wins):
 Nicky Henderson - Carole's Legacy (2010), Whoops A Daisy (2011)
 Oliver Sherwood - Surtee Du Berlais (2016), Papagana (2019)
 Donald McCain -  Whiteoak (2009), Bannixtown Glory (2020)

Winners

See also
Horse racing in Great Britain
List of British National Hunt races

References

Racing Post:

National Hunt hurdle races
Kempton Park Racecourse
National Hunt races in Great Britain
Recurring sporting events established in 2007
2007 establishments in England